Samantha May Kinghorn  (born 6 January 1996) is a Scottish World Champion wheelchair racer.

Personal history
In December 2010 Kinghorn was crushed by snow and ice  breaking her back. She had emergency surgery and spent five months in hospital. The injury to her spine left her paralysed from the waist down. Since then she has had to use a wheelchair for mobility. While in the Spinal Injuries Unit at Southern General Hospital her physiotherapist took her to Stoke Mandeville Stadium to take part in the WheelPower Inter Spinal Games where she was able to try out a variety of wheelchair sports, leading to her taking up wheelchair racing. She said:

Athletics career
Kinghorn is part of the Glasgow disability sports club Red Star, where she is coached by Ian Mirfin MBE (new years honours list 2015/16). She is classified as a T53 para-athlete. Sammi is the fastest ever female British wheelchair racer regardless of classification over 100m, 200m, 400m and 800m.

Kinghorn's first race was the 2012 London Mini Marathon, where she came second. Since then she has won many medals in domestic competitions and set Scottish records in the 100m and 200m. In 2013 Kinghorn was one of the first competitors to be named in the Scotland squad for the 2014 Commonwealth Games in Glasgow. She was chosen to be an athlete ambassador for Harper Macleod and a short promotional film  was made of her preparations for the Games. In the buildup to the Games, Kinghorn was named Glasgow's Disabled Athlete of the Year. At the Commonwealth Games she took part in the T54 1500m, and after qualifying third in her heat, she placed fifth in the final.

Kinghorn represented Team GB at the 2014 IPC European Championships in Swansea where she won Britain's first gold medal in the T53 Women's 400m and went on to win further golds over 100m and 800m.

Kinghorn competed for Team GB at 2016 Paralympic Games in Rio de Janeiro.  She placed 5th and 6th in the 100m and 400m T53 events but was disqualified in the 400m

Kinghorn achieved a sprint double at the 2017 World Para Athletics Championships in the winning the 100m and 200m.

In 2017 she will debut over the marathon distance in an attempt to qualify for the 2018 Commonwealth Games 

At the end of June 2021 she was in Manchester for the British Athletic Championships where she was second in a mixed classification 400m wheelchair race behind Hannah Cockroft and with Mel Woods third.

2020 Paralympics
Kinghorn among nine Scottish athletes who were chosen to compete at the postponed 2020 Summer Paralympics. Most were announced in July 2021. The others were Mel Woods, Libby Clegg, Jo Butterfield, Maria Lyle, Owen Miller, Derek Rae, Stef Reid and Ben Rowlings.

Kinghorn was appointed Member of the Order of the British Empire (MBE) in the 2022 Birthday Honours for services to disability sport.

References

External links
 facebook
 https://www.sammikinghorn.com

1996 births
Living people
People educated at Earlston High School
Scottish female wheelchair racers
Place of birth missing (living people)
Commonwealth Games competitors for Scotland
Athletes (track and field) at the 2014 Commonwealth Games
Sportspeople from Glasgow
Paralympic athletes of Great Britain
Athletes (track and field) at the 2016 Summer Paralympics
People with paraplegia
Athletes (track and field) at the 2020 Summer Paralympics
Members of the Order of the British Empire
20th-century Scottish women
21st-century Scottish women